This is a list of countries by planetary pressures–adjusted human development index (PHDI), as published by the UNDP in its 2020 Human Development Report. The index captures the HDI of a country adjusted for ecological and environmental factors like carbon dioxide emissions per person and material footprint. According to the PHDI, "The PHDI discounts the HDI for pressures on the planet to reflect a concern for intergenerational inequality, similar to the inequality-adjusted HDI adjustment which is motivated by a concern for intragenerational inequality."

Methodology 

The index captures the HDI of a country, after adjusting for its  carbon dioxide emissions per person and material footprint per person. Without any carbon emissions and material footprint, the HDI and PHDI would be equal; the greater these factors are, the greater the difference between the two.

List 
The table below ranks countries according to their planetary pressures–adjusted human development index (PHDI). Data is based on 2019 estimates.

2019 planetary pressures–adjusted HDI (PHDI) (2020 report)

See also
 List of countries by Human Development Index
 List of countries by inequality-adjusted Human Development Index

References

External links
 Human Development Reports

 

Planetary Pressures-Adjusted